Lyonel is a given name. Notable people with the name include:

Lyonel Feininger (1871–1956), German-American painter and caricaturist
Lyonel Laurenceau (born 1942), Haitian painter
Lyonel Power (c. 1375 – 1445), English composer
Lyonel Thomas Senter Jr. (1933-2011), United States federal judge